

Messent Conservation Park, formerly the Messent National Park and the Messent Wildlife Reserve, is a protected area in the Australian state of South Australia located in the state’s south-east in the gazetted localities of Colebatch and Deepwater about  south-east of the state capital of Adelaide and about  north-east of the town centre in Salt Creek.

The conservation park consists of land in sections 1 and 65 of the cadastral unit of the Hundred of Colebatch and Sections 1 and 10 in the cadastral unit of the Hundred of Messent. Section 1 in the Hundred of Messent first acquired protected area status as a wild-life reserve proclaimed under the Crown Lands Act 1929. On 9 November 1967, this land was proclaimed as the Messent National Park under the National Parks Act 1966. On 18 June 1970, section 1 in the Hundred of Colebatch was added to the national park. On 27 April 1972, the national park was reconstituted as the Messent Conservation Park under the National Parks and Wildlife Act 1972. On 6 December 1979, section 65 in Hundred of Colebatch and section 19 in Hundred of Messent were added to the conservation park.

In 1980, the conservation park was described as follows:
Messent Conservation Park conserves a large area of open scrub, open heath and tussock sedgeland, which include seven rare plant species.  These associations, in turn, provide valuable habitat for western grey kangaroos, wombats, echidnas, ash-grey mice, emus, mallee fowl and a variety of waterbirds…
This park is an extensive area of sand plain overlain by stabilized sand dunes.  Sedge flats, swamps and a lake occur in the interdunal depressions.  The vegetation is primarily Eucalyptus diversifolia open scrub with relatively large areas of open heath and tussock sedgeland…
 
Messent is currently recovering (regenerating) from a recent bushfire (1977).  The swamps and lake do not fill to the same level as they used to in the past and this may be attributed (at least in part) to the drainage of swampy land further to the south…

The conservation park is categorised as an IUCN Category III protected area  In 1980, it was listed on the now-defunct Register of the National Estate.

See also
Protected areas of South Australia

References

External links
Webpage for the Messent Conservation Park on the Protected Planet website

Conservation parks of South Australia
Naracoorte woodlands
Protected areas established in 1964
1964 establishments in Australia
South Australian places listed on the defunct Register of the National Estate